The Japanese manga series Eyeshield 21 was written by Riichiro Inagaki and illustrated by Yusuke Murata. The series follows Sena Kobayakawa, a student who coerced by Yoichi Hiruma, the school's American football team captain, reluctantly becomes an American football player under the pseudonym of "Eyeshield 21".

The manga was first published in Shueisha's magazine Weekly Shōnen Jump as a two-part one-shot on March 5 and 12, 2002. The regular serialization started with the publication of the first chapter in Weekly Shōnen Jump on July 23, 2002, where it was serialized weekly until its conclusion on June 15, 2009.

The 333 chapters, referred to as "downs", were collected and published into 37 tankōbon volumes by Shueisha starting on December 20, 2002; the last volume was released on October 2, 2009. The manga was adapted into a 145-episode anime series co-produced by TV Tokyo, Nihon Ad Systems and Gallop that aired in Japan on TV Tokyo from April 6, 2005 to March 19, 2008.

Eyeshield 21 was licensed for an English-language release in North America by Viz Media. It released Eyeshield 21 under the Shonen Jump Advanced label, with the first volume being released on April 5, 2005, and the last one on October 4, 2011. The manga has also been licensed in several countries, among them in France by Glénat, in Hong Kong by Culturecom, in Indonesia by Elex Media Komputindo, in Italy by Panini Comics, in South Korea by Daewon Media, and in Taiwan by Tong Li Publishing.

Volume list

Volumes 1–19

Volumes 20–37

References

Chapters
Eyeshield 21